Emelia Jackson (born 1989) is an Australian pastrycook, reality television contestant and marketing co-ordinator.

After finishing third in MasterChef Australia 2014, she returned to win MasterChef Australia: Back to Win in 2020.

Early life
Jackson was born in Melbourne in 1989 to an Australian father and a mother of Macedonian heritage. She attended Siena College for secondary school.

At age 14, Jackson was seriously injured after being struck by a car while catching a tram. After years of rehabilitation, during which time she missed a year of secondary school, her mother stated that the accident changed her personality to make her more driven toward her goals. Later, she attended Monash University, where she obtained a Bachelor of Psychology & Management.

MasterChef Australia
Jackson appeared as one of the top 24 contestants in the Australian reality television program MasterChef Australia 2014. She finished in third place on 27 July 2014.

Jackson was then invited to join the top 24 returning contestants in  MasterChef Australia: Back to Win in 2020. She was declared the competition winner over runner-up Laura Sharrad on 20 July 2020, winning $250,000.

Jackson and Sharrad (then Cassai) had both appeared in the 2014 series, where Sharrad finished second and Jackson third. Jackson and Sharrad had also both attended Siena College (Camberwell) as teenagers, although not in the same school years. 

In 2021, Jackson and partner Craig Gersbach had a daughter.

In November 2022, Jackson published a book of pastry techniques and recipes titled First, Cream the Butter and Sugar.

References

1989 births
Living people
MasterChef Australia
Participants in Australian reality television series
Reality cooking competition winners
Monash University alumni
Australian television chefs